Tracey Ann Kelly is an American television soap opera script writer.

Positions held
The Bold and the Beautiful
 Script writer: 1992 - 1996, 1998–present

Awards and nominations
Daytime Emmy Awards:

External links

American soap opera writers
1968 births
Living people
Charlotte Country Day School alumni
Screenwriters from North Carolina